The Sannine Formation, also called the Sannine Limestone, is a Cretaceous geologic formation in Lebanon.

Description 
It is primarily Cenomanian in age. The formation laterally varies from east to west; the western lowland "coastal" sequence is over 2000 metres thick and primarily consists of deep water limestone and chalk, while the eastern "mountain" sequence is 500–700 metres thick and consists of shallow water limestone. Pterosaur fossils have been recovered from the formation, including those of Mimodactylus and Microtuban. The pythonomorphs Pontosaurus, Eupodophis and probably Aphanizocnemus are known from the formation. Insects are also known from compression fossils, including those of a dragonfly, enigmatic pond-skater like insect Chresmoda. and a mesoblattinid cockroach. Compression fossils of  angiosperm Sapindopsis are also known. Numerous species of fossil fish are known, including Ionoscopid Spathiurus dorsalis and pycnodontid Flagellipinna rhomboides.

Fossil Content

See also 
 List of pterosaur-bearing stratigraphic units
 Paleontology in Lebanon

References 

Geologic formations of Lebanon
Cretaceous System of Asia
Albian Stage
Cenomanian Stage
Limestone formations
Marl formations
Lagoonal deposits
Lagerstätten
Fossiliferous stratigraphic units of Asia
Paleontology in Lebanon